Beach Blanket Tempest is an Australian musical with book and lyrics by Dennis Watkins and music by Chris Harriott, loosely based on Shakespeare's The Tempest.

Development
The musical was commissioned by the North Queensland-based New Moon Theatre Company, and developed from a self-contained sequence called "Beach Blanket Tempest" in a previous Watkins-Harriott musical, Dingo Girl.

Production history
Billed as "the surf rock musical to make Shakespeare turn in his grave", New Moon's original production of Beach Blanket Tempest opened at Cairns' Civic Theatre on 25 July 1984.  The production then undertook a national tour, with seasons in Townsville (Civic Theatre), Mackay (Theatre Royal), Rockhampton (Pilbeam Theatre), Mt Isa (Memorial Civic Theatre), Alice Springs (Arulen Arts Centre), Adelaide (Adelaide Festival Centre Playhouse), Canberra (Canberra Theatre) and finally a two-month season in Sydney (Footbridge Theatre), closing on 15 December 1984.

Further productions were presented by Brisbane's TN! Theatre Company in August 1988, Penrith's Q Theatre in November 1990, and Perth's SWY Theatre in August 1991.  Beach Blanket Tempest has also been performed by various schools and amateur theatre companies in Australia. 
Canada's Muskoka Festival presented it in their 1992 season, directed by Ron Ulrich, and starring Frank McKay, Lindsay Richardson, Carol McCartney, Shane MacPherson, Joann Kirwin-Clark, George Masswohl, and Tim Koetting.

Reception
The Sun-Herald described Beach Blanket Tempest as "a high-energy, wild and whacky rock spectacular" that "satisfies all the requirements of rock opera, plus loud, raunchy rock'n'roll numbers which induce foot-tapping and hand-clapping".The Canberra Times said "this show is a delight" and that "it will induce ecstasy in the under-30s".

Beach Blanket Tempest was named the 'Best New Oz Musical' of 1984 in The Sun-Herald.

References

External links
Beach Blanket Tempest at David Spicer Productions (performance rights)

1984 musicals
Australian musicals
Plays and musicals based on The Tempest